931 Whittemora (prov. designation:  or ) is a metallic background asteroid, approximately  in diameter, located in the outer region of the asteroid belt. It was discovered by French astronomer François Gonnessiat at the Algiers Observatory in North Africa on 19 March 1920. The M-type asteroid has a rotation period of 19.2 hours. It was named after American archaeologist Thomas Whittemore (1871–1950).

Orbit and classification 

Whittemora is a non-family asteroid of the main belt's background population when applying the hierarchical clustering method to its proper orbital elements. It orbits the Sun in the outer asteroid belt at a distance of 2.4–3.9 AU once every 5 years and 8 months (2,061 days; semi-major axis of 3.17 AU). Its orbit has an eccentricity of 0.23 and an inclination of 11° with respect to the ecliptic.

Discovery 

Whittemora was discovered by French astronomer François Gonnessiat at the Algiers Observatory in North Africa on 19 March 1920. Two nights later, it was independently discovered by Karl Reinmuth at the Heidelberg-Königstuhl State Observatory on 21 March 1920. However, the Minor Planet Center only credits Gonnessiat with the discovery.

Naming 

This minor planet was named after American scholar and archaeologist Thomas Whittemore (1871–1950), who was professor at both Harvard and Columbia universities. The  was mentioned in The Names of the Minor Planets by Paul Herget in 1955.

Physical characteristics 

In the Tholen classification, Whittemora is a metallic M-type asteroid. It is an M0 in the taxonomic classification according to the method used by Barucci (1987).

Rotation period 

In March 2016, a rotational lightcurve of Whittemora was obtained from photometric observations by French and Swiss astronomers Christophe Demeautis, Mickael Porte and Raoul Behrend. Lightcurve analysis gave a rotation period of  hours with a brightness variation of  magnitude. This result supersedes a period determination of 16+ hours by Pierre Antonini from June 2006, and of  hours with an amplitude of  magnitude by John Menke at the Menke Observatory in January 2004.

Diameter and albedo 

The Collaborative Asteroid Lightcurve Link adopts the results from IRAS, that is, an albedo of 0.1704 and a diameter of 45.27 km based on an absolute magnitude of 9.26. Two asteroid occultations on 1 January 2004 and 12 February 2015, gave a best-fit ellipse dimension of 45.0 × 45.0 and 49.0 × 49.0 kilometers, respectively. These timed observations are taken when the asteroid passes in front of a distant star. However the quality of the measurements are poorly rated.

References

External links 
 Lightcurve Database Query (LCDB), at www.minorplanet.info
 Dictionary of Minor Planet Names, Google books
 Asteroids and comets rotation curves, CdR – Geneva Observatory, Raoul Behrend
 Discovery Circumstances: Numbered Minor Planets (1)-(5000) – Minor Planet Center
 
 

000931
Discoveries by François Gonnessiat
Named minor planets
000931
19200319